Van H. Wanggaard (born April 19, 1952) is a Republican politician and former law enforcement officer.  He is a member of the Wisconsin State Senate, representing Racine and Kenosha counties since January 5, 2015.  He was previously elected to the same office in 2010, but was removed by recall election in June 2012.

Background/family life
Born in Fort Leavenworth, Kansas, Wanggaard graduated from Racine Lutheran High School in 1970. He then graduated from Gateway Technical College with a certificate in Police Science Instruction. Wanggard also took course work at University of Wisconsin–Extension, University of Wisconsin–Parkside, Green Bay Technical College, Milwaukee Area Technical College, Racine Technical College, Gateway Technical College, Wisconsin State Patrol Academy, and the United States Coast Guard National SAR School. Wanggard also taught at Gateway Technical College.

Wanggaard worked for the Racine Police Department from 1972 to 2001 as an investigator. He and his wife have two children.

Political career 
Wanggaard was elected to the Racine County Board of Supervisors in 2002, a seat he held until he joined the State Senate in 2011.

In 2006, Wanggaard ran for the 62nd Wisconsin Assembly district but was defeated by future Racine Mayor Cory Mason.

In 2010, Wanggaard ran again for state legislative office, this time challenging incumbent Democrat John Lehman in the 21st senate district. This time Wanggaard was successful, winning the seat as part of the 2010 Republican wave election which saw Republicans flip 721 state legislative seats around the country.

Shortly after the 2010 election, the new unified Republican government attempted to pass a controversial budget restructuring. The bill was characterized as an assault on unions and public education, and led to senate recall elections in 2011 and 2012, as well as a recall election for the Governor, Scott Walker. Wanggaard was one of the 16 senators who faced recall elections, and was challenged by his defeated 2010 rival, former-senator John Lehman. Lehman defeated Wanggaard in the recall election held on June 5, 2012. This was the 2nd time that a senator serving in the 21st district had been successfully recalled, the first being George Petak in 1996.

After the 21st was redrawn into a safe Republican district, Lehman chose not to run for re-election in 2014, opting instead to seek the Democratic nomination for Lieutenant Governor of Wisconsin. Wanggaard sought and received the Republican nomination to reclaim the 21st senate district and defeated Democrat Randy Bryce in the general election.

As of 2018, Wanggaard is the Wisconsin Senate Majority Caucus Chair.

Electoral history

Wisconsin Assembly (2006)

| colspan="6" style="text-align:center;background-color: #e9e9e9;"| General Election, November 7, 2006

Wisconsin Senate (2010, 2012, 2014, 2018)

References

External links
 Senator Van H. Wanggaard - Majority Caucus Chair at Wisconsin Legislature
 
 

1952 births
Living people
People from Fort Leavenworth, Kansas
Politicians from Racine, Wisconsin
University of Wisconsin–Parkside alumni
Milwaukee Area Technical College alumni
County supervisors in Wisconsin
Republican Party Wisconsin state senators
Recalled state legislators of the United States
21st-century American politicians